WRNK-LP (96.3 FM, "96.3 Keeper FM") is a radio station licensed to serve Lanett, Alabama.  The station is owned by Contact Ministry Center. It airs a Religious radio format as a ministry extension of Contact Ministries Center and Pastor John Eldridge.

The station was assigned the WRNK-LP call letters by the Federal Communications Commission on December 9, 2002.

WRNK-LP was a recipient of the John Allen Smith Outstanding Volunteer Award for 2005.

References

External links
WRNK-LP official website

WRNK-LP service area per the FCC database

RNK-LP
Radio stations established in 2004
Chambers County, Alabama
RNK-LP